James Alexander George Smith McCartney (30 June 1945 – 9 May 1980), also known as J. A. G. S. McCartney or "Jags" McCartney, was a Turks and Caicos Islander politician. He was the 1st Chief Minister of the Turks and Caicos Islands and held that position from 31 August 1976 until 9 May 1980, when he died when the private plane he was in crashed near Vineland, New Jersey, while flying from Washington DC to Atlantic City.

McCartney was born in Grand Turk to an accomplished Jamaican barrister, Harvey O. B. Fernandez McCartney and a Sunday school pianist, Sally McCartney, née Taylor of the Turks and Caicos. He was named after a prominent Jamaican barrister and distinguished legislator, James Alexander George Smith (1877–1942).

J.A.G.S. McCartney was the first leader and founder of the People's Democratic Movement (PDM), a grassroots organization established to address the many social and economic ills that had been pervasive throughout the Turks and Caicos Islands. A central goal of his was the attainment of self-determination for the people of the Turks and Caicos Islands. McCartney had particularly sought to mobilize the youth in the political process. A charismatic, dynamic and visionary figure, McCartney was determined to usher in a new Constitution that would foster and safeguard the rights of all Turks and Caicos Islanders, create new opportunities for citizens and advance the Country. Assuming office at age 31, McCartney remains one of the world's youngest democratically elected leaders in history. After his death, his deputy Oswald Skippings became Chief Minister at the age of 26.

National Heroes Day, a holiday celebrated on the last Monday in May, commemorates the life of McCartney. This holiday was later renamed to JAGs McCartney Day in 2020. Additionally, the Grand Turk International Airport is named in honour of him.

References

1945 births
1980 deaths
Accidental deaths in New Jersey
Chief Ministers of the Turks and Caicos Islands
People's Democratic Movement (Turks and Caicos Islands) politicians
Turks and Caicos Islands people of Jamaican descent
Victims of aviation accidents or incidents in 1980
Victims of aviation accidents or incidents in the United States